Sir William James Adams, KCMG (30 April 1932 – 24 April 2020) was a British diplomat.

Born in Wolverhampton, England, he was educated at Wolverhampton Grammar School and Shrewsbury School. He served as the United Kingdom's ambassador to Tunisia (1984–1987) and Egypt (1987–1992).

References
General
 
Footnotes

1932 births
2020 deaths
Ambassadors of the United Kingdom to Tunisia
Ambassadors of the United Kingdom to Egypt
Knights Commander of the Order of St Michael and St George
People educated at Shrewsbury School
People educated at Wolverhampton Grammar School
People from Wolverhampton